The Phocaea family (adj. Phocaean) is a collisional family of asteroids located between 2.25 and 2.5 AU in the inner region of the asteroid belt. Phocaea asteroids are of stony S-type composition and have orbits with eccentricities greater than 0.1 and inclinations between 18 and 32°. The family has an estimated age of 2.2 billion years and derives its name from its most massive member, 25 Phocaea which is about 75 km in diameter. Several Phocaean asteroids are also Mars-crossers.

Phocaea family region 

The Phocaea family region contains other collisional families such as the recently identified carbonaceous, Tamara family, named after its potentially largest member 326 Tamara. The family has an estimated age of 264 million years.

Members

References 
 

Asteroid groups and families